Aravind Singh (born 5 December 1990) is an Indian cricketer. He made his first-class debut for Odisha in the 2013–14 Ranji Trophy on 22 December 2013.

References

External links
 

1990 births
Living people
Indian cricketers
Odisha cricketers
People from Balangir
Cricketers from Odisha